Daho and Doo are two mutually intelligible Guere dialects which are divergent from other varieties spoken by the Guere people.

References

Languages of Ivory Coast
Wee languages